Adrion Dante "Dri" Archer (born August 9, 1991) is a former American football running back and return specialist. He was drafted by the Pittsburgh Steelers in the third round of the 2014 NFL Draft. He played college football at Kent State.

Archer has also been a member of the New York Jets and Buffalo Bills.

High school
Archer attended Venice High School, where he was a member of the basketball, football, and track teams.

In track, he finished second in the 100 meters final of state track meet in his first full season of running (behind World Class sprinter Dentarius Locke and ahead of third place Denard Robinson), with a time of 10.49 seconds. He also ran the 200 meters in 21.46 seconds.

As a senior, he was named to the all-area first-team in football. He helped Venice High School win two district titles.

College career
Archer was offered track scholarships from both Clemson and Arkansas. Kent State was the only school to offer him a football scholarship where he elected to attend. As a freshman at Kent State University, in 2009, he played in 11 games as a wide receiver/running back and had 246 rushing yards and 231 receiving yards. The following season, he had 140 rushing yards and 75 receiving yards. Before the 2011 season, Archer was ruled ineligible for academic reasons.

In 2012, Archer had 1,429 rushing yards, 16 rushing touchdowns, 561 receiving yards, and four receiving touchdowns. His 24 total touchdowns led the MAC and set a single-season school record. Against Ball State, Archer had a 99-yard kick return for a touchdown and set a career-high with 350 all-purpose yards. Against Eastern Michigan, he had a rushing touchdown, a receiving touchdown, and a kick return touchdown. Against Army, he had 222 rushing yards, a rushing touchdown, and a passing touchdown. Archer was named the MAC Special Teams Player of the Year. He made the All-MAC first-team as a running back and kick returner. He was also a finalist for the Paul Hornung Award. Archer was a consensus All-American.

Statistics
Source:

Professional career

2014 NFL Draft

At the NFL Scouting Combine, Archer ran the 40-yard dash in 4.26 seconds, which is the fourth-fastest time ever recorded since the NFL began electronic timing.

Pittsburgh Steelers
He was drafted by the Pittsburgh Steelers in the 3rd round with the 97th overall pick in the 2014 NFL Draft.

On September 7, 2014, Archer made his NFL debut against the Cleveland Browns. In his rookie season, Archer totaled ten carries for 40 yards and seven receptions for 23 yards to go along with occasional kickoff return duties in 12 games.

In 2015, Archer saw more action in the kick return game but did not factor into the offense. He finished with 14 kickoff returns for 324 net yards for a 25.29 average.

On November 5, 2015, Archer was waived by the Steelers.

New York Jets
On February 3, 2016, Archer signed a reserve/future contract with the New York Jets. On May 9, 2016, Archer was waived by the Jets.

Buffalo Bills
Archer was claimed off waivers by the Buffalo Bills on May 10, 2016. When he failed to report to the team, he was placed on the reserve/did not report list on May 18, 2016.

See also
 List of college football yearly rushing leaders

References

External links
Kent State Golden Flashes bio
Career statistics at Pro-Football-Reference.com

1991 births
Living people
All-American college football players
American football return specialists
American football running backs
Buffalo Bills players
Kent State Golden Flashes football players
New York Jets players
People from Sarasota County, Florida
Pittsburgh Steelers players
Players of American football from Florida